The 2010–11 CHL season was the 19th season of the Central Hockey League (CHL).

League business

Team foldings
The Amarillo Gorillas and the Corpus Christi IceRays folded and both were replaced by a North American Hockey League team.

Expansion
On June 1, 2010, the Central Hockey League (CHL) and the International Hockey League (IHL) announced that they would merge and play under the CHL moniker.

On June 10, 2010, it was announced that four IHL teams made the move to the CHL, the Fort Wayne Komets, Bloomington PrairieThunder, Dayton Gems and the Quad City Mallards. It was later announced that the Evansville IceMen would also participate in the league. This is after team ownership in Evansville, Indiana purchased the former IHL Muskegon Lumberjacks franchise.

League realignment

Turner Conference

Bloomington PrairieThunder
Colorado Eagles
Dayton Gems

Evansville IceMen
Fort Wayne Komets
Missouri Mavericks

Quad City Mallards
Rapid City Rush
Wichita Thunder

Berry Conference

Allen Americans
Arizona Sundogs
Bossier-Shreveport Mudbugs

Laredo Bucks
Mississippi RiverKings
Odessa Jackalopes

Rio Grande Valley Killer Bees
Texas Brahmas
Tulsa Oilers

All-Star Game

It was announced that the 2011 Central Hockey League All-Star Game would be held at the Rushmore Plaza Civic Center, home of the Rapid City Rush on January 12, 2011. The defending champions Rapid City Rush and coach Joe Ferras will form one team in the match-up and will be opposed by a team of CHL All-Stars composed of players from the other 17 CHL member teams.

Regular season

Conference standings

Playoffs

Playoff Bracket

Awards
Source:Central Hockey League Historical Award Winners
Ray Miron President's Cup (Playoff Champions) - Bossier-Shreveport Mudbugs
Bud Poile Governors’ Cup (regular-season champions) - Allen Americans
Most Valuable Player - Riley Nelson, Colorado
Most Outstanding Goaltender - Robby Nolan, Missouri
Most Outstanding Defenseman - Andrew Martens, Wichita
Rookie of the Year - Aaron Lewicki, Rio Grande Valley
Coach of the Year - Jason Christie, Bloomington
Man of the Year - Simon Watson, Missouri
Rick Kozuback Award - Jeff Christian, Evansville 
Joe Burton Award (Scoring Champion) - Sebastien Thine, Odessa
Playoff Most Valuable Player - Jeff Kyrzakos, Bossier-Shreveport
All-Star Game Most Valuable Player (Rapid City) - Ryan Menei, Rapid City
All-Star Game Most Valuable Player (CHL All-Stars) - Jason Dale, Bloomington
Athletic Trainer of the Year – George Bullock Jr., Bossier-Shreveport
Equipment Manager of the Year– Romeo Vivit, Rapid City

2010-2011 All-CHL Team
Forward: Sebastien Thinel, Odessa
Forward: Riley Nelson, Colorado
Forward: Chad Woollard, Texas
Defenceman: Darcy Campbell, Rio Grande Valley
Defenceman: Andrew Martens, Wichita
Goaltender : Robby Nolan, Missouri

2010-2011 CHL All-Rookie Team
Forward - Aaron Lewicki, Rio Grande Valley
Forward - Adam Chorneyko, Colorado
Forward - Gary Steffes, Tulsa
Defenceman - David Strathman, Allen
Defenceman - Alan Mazur, Bloomington
Goaltender - Wayne Savage, Texas

References

External links
Central Hockey League website

 
2010-11
CHL